Kingston Hospital NHS Foundation Trust runs Kingston Hospital, an acute NHS hospital in Kingston upon Thames, South West London. The Trust was licensed as an NHS Foundation Trust by Monitor (NHS) from 1 May 2013. The Trust has been rated 'outstanding' by the CQC.

Services
The Trust serves approximately 320,000 people in Kingston, Richmond, Roehampton, Putney, East Elmbridge and other parts of South West London. It directly employs some 2,750 staff with another 300 staff employed by contractors but working on behalf of the Trust.

The trust broke from the national pay agreement in August 2015 by giving a 1% pay rise to its 22 senior non-clinical staff - those earning above £57,069 - in line with the award for the rest of the staff.  The trust does not qualify for London weighting and was worried that it would lose senior managers.

Performance
It spent 9% of its total turnover on agency staff in 2014/5.

The trust relied on a working capital facility arrangement made to qualify for Foundation Trust status with Lloyds Bank to pay staff each month from April 2016 until it negotiated a £10 million loan from the Department of Health in 2017.

See also
 List of hospitals in England
 List of NHS trusts

References

External links
Kingston Hospital NHS Trust
Born Too Soon Appeal
The Wolverton Centre at Kingston Hospital

NHS foundation trusts
Health in London